Clathrodrillia wolfei is a species of sea snail, a marine gastropod mollusk in the family Drilliidae.

Description
The length of an adult shell varies between 14 mm and 19 mm.

Distribution
This species occurs in the Western Atlantic Ocean (on the North Carolina Shelf) and the Caribbean Sea off Mexico; in the Gulf of Mexico off Alabama, Florida, Louisiana.

References

 Donn L.Tippett, Taxonomic notes on the western Atlantic Turridae (Gastropoda: Conoidea); The Nautilus. v. 109 (1995-1996) 
 Tucker, J.K. 2004 Catalog of recent and fossil turrids (Mollusca: Gastropoda). Zootaxa 682:1-1295. 
 Rosenberg, G., F. Moretzsohn, and E. F. García. 2009. Gastropoda (Mollusca) of the Gulf of Mexico, pp. 579–699 in Felder, D.L. and D.K. Camp (eds.), Gulf of Mexico–Origins, Waters, and Biota. Biodiversity. Texas A&M Press, College Station, Texas

External links

 Fallon P.J. (2016). Taxonomic review of tropical western Atlantic shallow water Drilliidae (Mollusca: Gastropoda: Conoidea) including descriptions of 100 new species. Zootaxa. 4090(1): 1-363

wolfei
Gastropods described in 1995